Konstantinos Vlachos (born 6 February 1995) is a Greek footballer who plays as a centre back.

Career
On 21 January 2019, Panegialios announced the return of Vlachos, after he had played for a Kallithea since October 2018.

References

External links
 http://www.superleaguegreece.net/el/teams/team/panionios-fc-396/2015-2016-superleague-52/players/kostas-vlachos-1876

1995 births
Living people
Greece youth international footballers
AEK Athens F.C. players
Olympiacos F.C. players
Fostiras F.C. players
Panionios F.C. players
Panegialios F.C. players
Kallithea F.C. players
Super League Greece players
Association football central defenders
Footballers from Athens
Greek footballers